Abdul Kaium (also spelled Quayum; born 1948) is a Bangladeshi police officer who served as the Inspector General of Police of Bangladesh Police during 2005–2006.

Biography
Kaium was born in Pakhimara village in Baksiganj Upazila of Jamalpur District, He earned his bachelor's and master's in economics from the University of Dhaka in 1968 and 1969 respectively. He was trained at Bramsil Staff College in England.

Kaium served as the chief of Special Branch (SB).

On 7 July 2005, Kaium became the Inspector General of Police of Bangladesh Police, first with a cadre service background.

References

Living people
1948 births
People from Jamalpur District
University of Dhaka alumni
Inspectors General of Police (Bangladesh)
Date of birth missing (living people)